Alfred Wonston or Wolston (fl. 1407–1426) of Newton Abbot, Devon, was an English politician.

He was a Member (MP) of the Parliament of England for Totnes in
1407, for Barnstaple in 1410 and 1411, and for Tavistock in 1426.

References

Year of birth missing
Year of death missing
English MPs 1410
English MPs 1407
English MPs 1411
English MPs 1426
Members of the Parliament of England (pre-1707) for Totnes
Members of the Parliament of England (pre-1707) for Barnstaple